The West Indian is a play by Richard Cumberland first staged at the Drury Lane Theatre in 1771. A comedy, it depicts Belcour, a West Indian plantation-owner, travelling to Britain. Belcour tries to overcome his father's lingering disapproval of him and marry his sweetheart Louisa. Its hero, who probably owes much to the suggestion of Garrick, is a young scapegrace fresh from the tropics, "with rum and sugar enough belonging to him to make all the water in the Thames into punch," — a libertine with generous instincts, which prevail in the end. This early example of the modern drama was favorably received; Boden translated it into German, and Goethe acted in it at the Weimar court.

The play was a success running for 28 performances in its original run and was Cumberland's most popular comic work. One of the Drury Lane staff observed "the success which has attended the performances of The West Indian has exceeded that of any comedy within the memory of the oldest man living". The play proved popular in North America and was staged in the West Indies, British North America, and in the United States. It was the first English language play known to have been staged in Jersey (on 5 May 1792).  It was staged at Yale on April 13, 1773 by an all male cast  who were members of the Linonian literary society, which included Nathan Hale and David Bushnell. A popular character was the Irishman Major O'Flaherty who re-appeared in the 1785 play The Natural Son.

The play was one of a number written by Cumberland that contained sympathetic depictions of colonists from the British Empire.

Bibliography
 Arnold, Albert James. A History of Literature in the Caribbean: English- and Dutch-speaking countries. John Benjamins Publishing, 2001.
 Nettleton, George H. & Case, Arthur E. British Dramatists from Dryden to Sheridan. Southern Illinois University Press, 1975.

References

Plays by Richard Cumberland
1771 plays